Jo Hyun-sik (born March 13, 1983) is a South Korean actor.

Filmography

Television series

Film

Musical

Theater

References

External links

Jo Hyun-sik at Daum 
Jo Hyun-sik at Naver Movies 

South Korean male television actors
South Korean male film actors
South Korean male stage actors
1983 births
Living people
21st-century South Korean male actors
South Korean television personalities